Federal elections were held in Belgium on 26 May 2019, alongside the country's European and regional elections. All 150 members of the Chamber of Representatives were elected from eleven multi-member constituencies.

The right-wing Vlaams Belang (VB) saw a resurgence in Flanders, and with the New Flemish Alliance (NVA), parties subscribing to Flemish separatism and nationalism obtained nearly 50% of the vote in Flanders. The Swedish coalition of N-VA, CD&V, MR and Open VLD lost more than a quarter of its seats, the worst government punishment in 20 years.

In addition, gains for the far-left Workers' Party of Belgium (PVDA-PTB), and the green Ecolo party in Wallonia occurred. Overall, traditional parties suffered losses in both regions.

Background

Following the 2014 elections, a centre-right government consisting of N-VA, CD&V, Open Vld and MR was formed, led by Prime Minister Charles Michel (MR). This government coalition was unique in several aspects: the N-VA participated for the first time, the MR was the only French-speaking party, and the French-speaking Socialist Party was not part of the government for the first time in 25 years.

Local elections were held on 14 October 2018. As such, the 2019 simultaneous regional, federal and European elections were held only several months after the local elections.

In early December 2018, a political crisis emerged regarding the Global Compact for Migration, which was supposed to be signed but sparked instead opposition from government party N-VA. As the three other government parties as well as a large majority in parliament supported the compact, N-VA left the government and the three other parties continued briefly as a minority cabinet (Michel II) with an unclear status. Prime Minister Michel ultimately offered his resignation to the King on 18 December 2018, who accepted it three days later. As regular elections were scheduled for May 2019 anyway, snap elections were only favoured by N-VA and Vlaams Belang and did not happen, and the minority cabinet continued as a caretaker government until the elections.

Electoral system
</div><noinclude>

The 150 members of the Chamber of Representatives were elected in 11 multi-member constituencies, being the ten provinces and Brussels, with between 4 and 24 seats. Seats are allocated using the D'Hondt method, with an electoral threshold of 5% per constituency.

Representatives elected from the five Flemish Region provinces, Antwerp (24), East Flanders (20), Flemish Brabant (15), Limburg (12) and West Flanders (16), automatically belonged to the Dutch-speaking language group in parliament, whereas those elected from the five provinces of Wallonia, Hainaut (18), Liège (15), Luxembourg (4), Namur (6) and Walloon Brabant (5), formed the French-speaking language group. The 15 members elected in Brussels could choose to join either group. Apportionment of seats is done every ten years in accordance with population data, last by royal order of 31 January 2013.

The 60-member Senate is composed of 50 representatives from the regional and community parliaments, plus 10 co-opted senators proportionally divided among parties based on the result of the federal election.

All Belgian citizens aged 18 or over were obligated to participate in the election. Non-Belgian citizens residing in Belgium (regardless of EU citizenship) couldn't vote, whereas Belgian citizens living abroad could register to vote.

Date
The 2011–14 state reform changed several aspects regarding federal elections. Starting with the May 2014 election, which coincided with European Parliament and regional elections, the federal parliament is elected for a five-year term rather than a four-year term.

The federal elections would from then on always coincide with the European Parliament elections; snap federal elections would trigger a parliamentary term lasting until the next European Parliament elections. However, as of 2017, a law needed for this to take effect had not yet been enacted. Given the five-year term for all three elections, they all coincided in 2019 regardless, as no snap federal elections were called.

Additionally, de facto practice is to formally dissolve parliament and trigger new elections by Declaration of Revision of the Constitution shortly before regular expiry of the parliamentary term.

Parties and leaders

Lead candidates 

The following candidates are the first on the respective party list (lijsttrekker / tête de liste) per constituency.

Dutch-speaking constituencies

French-speaking constituencies

Campaign
Despite leaving the government coalition in late 2018, it was the explicit ambition of N-VA to continue governing after the May 2019 election. In January 2019, the party put forward ex-minister Jan Jambon as candidate for Prime Minister should the party enter a coalition. A continuation of the "Swedish coalition" (N-VA, MR, CD&V and Open Vld), potentially expanded with cdH, was a likely scenario. Outgoing Prime Minister Charles Michel (MR) was candidate to continue in his position.

Meanwhile, the French-speaking Socialist Party (PS) had the ambition to re-enter government as well, or "re-conquer" as formulated by leader Elio Di Rupo, after being in the opposition at federal level and being ousted from the Walloon government.

Additionally, there was speculation that the Flemish liberal and green parties (Open Vld and Groen) would favour cooperating, given Groen's recent rise and their local governing coalitions in cities like Mechelen, Gent and Oostende. However, their French-speaking counterparts, MR and Ecolo, are politically and ideologically further apart.

Retiring incumbents
The following incumbent members of the Chamber of Representatives announced their retirement from (national) politics:
 Hans Bonte (sp.a, Flemish Brabant)
 Peter Dedecker (N-VA, East Flanders)
 Alain Mathot (PS, Liège)
 Laurette Onkelinx (PS, Brussels)
 Goedele Uyttersprot (N-VA, East Flanders)
 Dirk Van der Maelen (sp.a, East Flanders)
 Eric Van Rompuy (CD&V, Flemish Brabant)
 Peter Vanvelthoven (sp.a, Limburg)
 Jan Vercammen (N-VA, West Flanders)

Opinion polls

Results

Results by region

Flanders

Wallonia

Brussels-Capital

Aftermath

The election once again exposed the deep linguistic, ethnic and regional divisions of Belgium, with the Dutch-speaking region of Flanders strongly voting for right-wing Flemish nationalist and separatist parties, and the French-speaking region of Wallonia strongly voting left.

In response to Vlaams Belang's surge in support there has been some speculation that the N-VA leader Bart De Wever may break the Cordon sanitaire imposed on the party, resulting in the two Flemish nationalist parties joining forces, by refusing to rule out talks with the VB, as their strong results could make forming a coalition more difficult.

The People's Party, a small right-wing French-speaking party, dissolved on 18 June through an internal party vote in response to losing their only seat in the elections. Former party leader Mischaël Modrikamen blamed the "systematic exclusion of the People's Party from the political and media debate."

In the days following the election, King Philippe held consultations with all main party leaders, including Vlaams Belang party leader Tom Van Grieken. According to The Guardian, it was the first time a Belgian monarch met a representative from a far-right party since 1936, when King Leopold III met the representatives of the Rexist Party.

On 30 May, King Philippe appointed Johan Vande Lanotte (sp.a) and Didier Reynders (MR), two experienced politicians with a long period of service, as informateurs. They reported on their progress by 6 June as expected, after which they were given some more time, with a new deadline of 17 June. After this deadline passed, another extension was granted until 1 July, and again until 29 July and one more extension until 9 September.

On 24 August the Belgian government decided to appoint Didier Reynders as European Commissioner. On 4 October 2019, King Philippe announced the end of the first phase of federal government formation talks, with the informateurs advising that a government of the N-VA, the Socialist Party and the Greens was the best option to pursue. The informateurs will report back to the king of the 4 November, following which a formateur will be appointed to introduce the third stage of government formation.

On 4 November, the two new informateurs, Rudy Demotte and Geert Bourgeois, offered their resignations to the King, as they could not break the political deadlock.

On 17 March 2020, the successor of Michel II Government, the Wilmès Government, had its mandate extended. Most parliamentary parties provided them external support in order to manage the coronavirus pandemic. Informal talks on forming a new government began in June 2020. Wilmès II government was eventually replaced by the permanent seven-party coalition — De Croo Government in October, with Wilmès becoming one of the deputy prime ministers.

See also
2019 Belgian regional elections

References

External links
Elections 2019 Federal Public Service Interior

Federal
Federal
Federal elections in Belgium
Belgium